Abdul-Rahim Hameed Aufi (born 23 May 1963) is an Iraqi football forward who played for Iraq in the 1986 FIFA World Cup. He also played for Al-Jaish.

Rahim Hamed was a prolific goalscorer who was leading goalscorer in the Iraqi league for three consecutive seasons from 1985 to 1987.

After becoming joint leading scorer with nine goals alongside Ahmed Radhi and Hussein Saeed, he was called into Iraq’s World Cup squad by Brazilian coach Evaristo de Macedo for the final tournament in Mexico.

Career statistics

International goals
Scores and results list Iraq's goal tally first.

References

External links
 

1963 births
Living people
Iraqi footballers
Iraq international footballers
Association football forwards
Olympic footballers of Iraq
Footballers at the 1984 Summer Olympics
1986 FIFA World Cup players
Footballers at the 1986 Asian Games
Al-Mina'a SC managers
Al-Shorta SC managers
Asian Games competitors for Iraq
Iraqi football managers